The Portage Canal was built to connect the Fox River and Wisconsin River at Portage, Wisconsin along the Fox-Wisconsin Waterway.  For a time, it completed a route from the north Atlantic Ocean, through the St. Lawrence Seaway and down the Mississippi River to the Gulf of Mexico, and back to the Atlantic.

History

Numerous attempts were made to build the thin Wisconsin-Fox connection through the marshy land, beginning in 1837 with the formation of the Portage Canal Company. Digging and hauling by hand through two and a half miles of muddy terrain, the project was quickly abandoned. A second project, started in 1849, managed to cut a path usable by canoe, but not viable for commerce. The final project, complete with locks to raise the water level of the Fox to that of the Wisconsin's, was not completed until 1876 by the Army Corps of Engineers. Unfortunately, by then, the railroads were quick on their way, followed soon thereafter by the automobile.
The Portage Canal acquired a new steel gate and concrete lock in 1926 due to a rupture of the 1876 wooden gate and the quoin post of the west gate of the lock in April 1926. A local contractor, M.E. White Company of Chicago, Illinois was awarded the bid, August 1926. The firm completed the repairs of lock and replace of the 1876 wooden gate under the supervision of the U. S Army Corps of Engineers, Milwaukee, Wisconsin. The 1926 Portage Canal Lock was the first steel and concrete lock on the Fox River. The subcontractor for the steel gate was the Lakeside Bridge and Steel Company of Wisconsin. During the re-construction process the Engineers were faced with containing underground springs beneath the lock, which caused considerable delays. The White Construction Co. repaired the fallen wall and dismantled the remaining wall of the lock, which were re-laid, and constructed according to the original configurations of the 1876 construction. The White Construction Company used 9,000 barrels of Portland cement to build the locks. The canal lock and new gate were completed in May 1928.

The use of the canal as a major means of commerce lasted only a few decades, though pleasure craft, including steamboats, continued to ply the narrow waterway. In following years, the canal began to degrade through lack of upkeep. The canal was used until 1951, when the Fort Winnebago Lock was bulldozed in and the Wisconsin River Locks were welded shut.

Currently, water pumps provide the only substantial flow and aeration. Continued attempts have been made to restore the remainder of the canal to its original condition and the Portage Canal Society continues to try to raise funds and make improvements. In the fall of 2015, ground was broken along the eastern part of the downtown section to construct government offices and is expected to be completed and open in 2017.

References

External links

Portage Canal Society

Canals in Wisconsin
Portage, Wisconsin
Canals opened in 1876
National Register of Historic Places in Columbia County, Wisconsin
Canals on the National Register of Historic Places in Wisconsin
Portages on the National Register of Historic Places
Fox–Wisconsin Waterway